Mohd Nor Farhan Bin Muhammad, P.B. (born 19 December 1984) is a Malaysian footballer who plays as forward and attacking midfielder.

Farhan's international senior debut was against Singapore on 31 May 2006. He also played in 2006 Asian Games in Doha, Qatar represented Malaysia U-23 team. During the first match of the 2015 Asian Cup qualifiers against Qatar Farhan only played in the second half. It ended with his team losing 0–2 to Qatar in the match.

Club career

Terengganu
Farhan made his senior debut with east coast Malaysia club Terengganu and played for the club during 2005–06 season until 2006–07 season. Farhan enjoyed a highly successful season with the club and became one of the top scorer.

PDRM
After two successful seasons with Terengganu, Farhan moved to on the rise club during that time PDRM. He helped the club to gain 9th place in 2007–08 Malaysia Super League. He scored two goals on big winning over Kuala Lumpur in the Malaysia Cup Group B match, 7–0.

Kelantan

2012 season
After a season playing for T-Team, Farhan returned to Kelantan in 2012 season. In last league match campaign, with a resounding 3–1 victory against Sarawak in Kelantan's final (26th) match at the Sultan Muhammad IV Stadium in Kota Bharu. Farhan put the finishing touches with a brace, his goals coming in the 65th and 67th minutes respectively. Kelantan's captain Badhri Radzi had put the hosts ahead in the 61st minute before.

In the first round of the FA Cup, against Sarawak Farhan became a hero when he scored the winner goal in the final minute after both teams almost ended draw. Kelantan won 2–1 and the first goal scored by Indra Putra. Farhan's brace in the 3–0 win over KL SPA in the first leg of the FA Cup quarter-final has virtually sealed Kelantan's place in the last four. Farhan credited his strike partner Onyekachi Nwoha for his goal rush during that match. Farhan missed the action in the 1–0 win over Sime Darby in the FA Cup final when coach Bojan Hodak opted to pair up Norshahrul Idlan with Mohammed Ghaddar in attack.

On 23 May, Farhan was the hero for the Kelantan, scoring a brace in the second and 18th minutes when Kelantan defeated Terengganu 3–2 in 2012 AFC Cup knockout stage. Rizal Fahmi contributed the other goal in the 44th minute. Despite playing on a wet and slippery pitch after a thunderstorm, Kelantan took only two minutes to grab the lead. From a pass by Ghanaian striker Denny Antwi, Farhan easily beat goalkeeper Sharbinee Allawee. Denny Antwi was again the provider in the 18th minute and Farhan gleefully tucked away the chance to make it 2–0. A minute before half-time, Kelantan raced to a 3–0 lead when Rizal Fahmi stunned Sharbinee Allawee with a 30-yard free-kick. Terengganu replied through Ismail Faruqi (56th) and Forkey Doe (83rd). With that victory Kelantan enabled to play the quarter-finals against Arbil. Unfortunately, Arbil won 6–2 on aggregate.

On 15 October, Farhan scored winning goal for Kelantan in the 62nd minute during first leg of Malaysia Cup semi-finals against Selangor. Nevertheless, Farhan has been unable to play in the Malaysia Cup final against ATM FA after picking up his second yellow card in the 2–0 semi-final, second leg win over Selangor.

2013 season
On 28 November, Farhan scored 1 goal in pre-season match against QAS. Kelantan FA won that match 3–0. Another 2 goals scored by Khairul Izuan and Aris Zaidi.

Return to Terengganu
Farhan rejoined Terengganu despite Kelantan offering high salary for the player.

Return to Kelantan
Farhan later make a return to Kelantan in 2015. He gets an injury during the 2015 Malaysia Cup against T-Team which made him unavailable for the rest of the competition. After being frozen out of the Kelantan first team as  a result of new head coach Fajr Ibrahim reshuffling of the team, Farhan signed with Malaysia FAM League team D'AR Wanderers on loan from April 2018 until the end of the 2018 season.

International career
Farhan was selected to represent Malaysia for 2007 AFC Asian Cup. He only made two appearances as substitute. Farhan also helping Malaysia to win 2007 Merdeka Tournament after defeating Myanmar 3–1. He was a member of the Malaysia team when Malaysia participated in 2008 AFF Suzuki Cup. B. Sathianathan was the team coach at that time.

Career statistics

Club
As of 13 May 2018.

International

Honours

Club

Kelantan
 Malaysia Super League: 2012; Runner-up 2010
 Malaysia Cup: 2010, 2012; Runner-up 2009, 2013
 Malaysia FA Cup: 2012, 2013; Runner-up 2009, 2015
 Malaysia Charity Shield: Runner-up 2012

Individual
FAM Football Awards
Best Young Players: 2005/06
Best Striker: 2013, 2014

References

External links
 
 Mohd Nor Farhan Muhammad at SoccerPunter.com
 
 
 

Living people
1984 births
People from Terengganu
Malaysian footballers
Malaysia international footballers
PDRM FA players
Terengganu F.C. II players
Terengganu FC players
Kelantan FA players
2007 AFC Asian Cup players
Malaysia Super League players
Association football wingers
Association football forwards
Footballers at the 2006 Asian Games
Footballers at the 2014 Asian Games
Malaysian people of Malay descent
Association football midfielders
Asian Games competitors for Malaysia